Joshua Boschee is an American politician, who was elected to the North Dakota House of Representatives in the 2012 state elections. A member of the North Dakota Democratic-NPL Party, he represents the 44th District in the legislature, serving alongside Karla Rose Hanson in a dual-member district.

He is the first openly gay candidate ever elected to the state legislature in North Dakota. His campaign was opposed by a series of attack ads alleging that he was promoting a "gay agenda," which were revealed to have been funded by Virginia politician and anti-LGBT activist Eugene Delgaudio through his group Public Advocate of the United States.

Originally from Minot, Boschee currently resides in Fargo, and was an employee of Minnesota State University Moorhead at the time of his election.

References

External links
Joshua Boschee

1982 births
21st-century American politicians
Gay politicians
LGBT state legislators in North Dakota
Living people
Democratic Party members of the North Dakota House of Representatives
People from Minot, North Dakota
Politicians from Fargo, North Dakota